Alexandra Binaris is a South African fashion model.

Early life 
Alexandra Binaris is of Greek, Portuguese, Spanish and German descent, and grew up in Richards Bay, KwaZulu-Natal, South Africa. Before pursuing modelling professionally, she studied Media, Marketing and Dramatic Arts and later got her post graduate in Advertising and Marketing at the University of Cape Town, graduating Cum Laude on Deans List.

Career 
Alexandra had been scouted on numerous occasions but always put her studies first. Once graduating, Binaris went to a prominent agency in Cape Town, and she was signed immediately. Within a day, an Elite Model Management scout who was present at the time signed her to Elite worldwide and Society in New York and was sent her to Paris. She debuted as a Louis Vuitton exclusive.

Binaris is deemed one of the most successful and highest paid models from South Africa.

References 

Living people
1996 births
People from Johannesburg
People from KwaZulu-Natal
South African female models
University of Cape Town alumni
South African people of French descent
South African people of German descent
South African people of Greek descent
South African people of Portuguese descent
South African people of Spanish descent
South African feminists
Ford Models models
Elite Model Management models
Louis Vuitton exclusive models